Robby Krieger is the third solo studio album by Robby Krieger, former guitarist for The Doors. The album was released in 1985, and is entirely instrumental.

Track listing 
 "Bag Lady" (Don Preston) – 9:00
 "Reggae Funk" (Krieger) – 4:19
 "Bass Line Street" (Krieger) – 3:51
 "Costa Brava" (Krieger) – 3:24
 "Noisuf" (Arthur Barrow, Krieger) – 14:44

Personnel
 Robby Krieger – guitar
 Arthur Barrow – bass
 Bruce Gary – drums
 Don Preston – keyboards

References

1985 albums
Robby Krieger albums